Romanovka is a rural locality (a selo) and the administrative center of Romanovsky Selsoviet of Oktyabrsky District, Amur Oblast, Russia. The population was 427 as of 2018. There are 8 streets.

Geography 
Romanovka is located 20 km east of Yekaterinoslavka (the district's administrative centre) by road. Borisovo is the nearest rural locality.

References 

Rural localities in Oktyabrsky District, Amur Oblast